Mrinmoy Guha Neogi (born 1 January 1957) Is a Bangladeshi agricultural scientist. He was awarded the Independence Award in 2021 for his contribution to science and technology.

Award 

 Independence Award (2021)

References 

Living people
1957 births
People from Tangail District
Bangladesh Agricultural University alumni
Jahangirnagar University alumni
University of Oslo alumni
Recipients of the Independence Day Award